The 2018 United States House of Representatives elections in New Jersey were held on November 6, 2018, to elect the 12 U.S. representatives from the state of New Jersey, one from each of the state's 12 congressional districts. The elections coincided with other elections to the House of Representatives, elections to the United States Senate and various state and local elections.

Democrats won 4 seats from Republicans and changed control from 7–5 for Democrats to 11–1 for Democrats, the lowest number of seats Republicans have won in the state since 1912. This is the first time since the 1912 elections that Republicans failed to hold any seat in North Jersey.

However, Representative Jeff Van Drew of the  2nd district would later change his party affiliation from Democratic to Republican in December 2019 bringing it down to 10-2.

Overview
Results of the 2018 United States House of Representatives elections in New Jersey by district:

District 1

The 1st district is based in South Jersey and includes most of Camden County along with parts of Burlington County and Gloucester County. The incumbent is Democrat Donald Norcross, who has represented the district since 2014. He was re-elected to a second term with 60% of the vote in 2016.

Democratic primary

Results

Republican primary

Candidates
Paul Dilks

Results

General election

Results

District 2

The 2nd district is based in South Jersey and is the biggest Congressional District in the state. It includes all of Atlantic, Cape May, Cumberland and Salem Counties and parts of Burlington, Camden, Gloucester, and Ocean counties.

The 2nd district was an open seat in 2018. Frank LoBiondo, a Republican who had represented the district since 1995, announced in November 2017 that he would not run for re-election in 2018. LoBiondo won in 2016 with 59% of the vote.

Democratic primary
This was one of 80 Republican-held House districts targeted by the Democratic Congressional Campaign Committee in 2018.

Candidates
Declared
 William Cunningham, former aide to U.S. Senator Cory Booker
 Jeff Van Drew, state senator
 Tanzie Youngblood, retired teacher
 Nate Kleinman, farmer and activist

Withdrew
 Sean Thom, school administrator

Endorsements

Results

Republican primary

Candidates
Declared
 Sam Fiocchi, former state assemblyman
 Seth Grossman, former Atlantic County Freeholder
 Hirsh Singh, aerospace engineer and candidate for governor in 2017
 Robert Turkavage, former FBI agent and independent candidate for U.S. Senate in 2012

Withdrew

 Brian T. Fitzherbert, defense contractor, project manager, engineer 
 Mark McGovern, activist
 John Zarych, attorney
 James Toto, Somers Point City Councilman

Declined
 Chris A. Brown, state senator
 Don Guardian, former mayor of Atlantic City
 Frank LoBiondo, incumbent representative
 Vincent J. Polistina, former state assemblyman
 Mike Torrissi, Hammonton Town Councilman

Endorsements

Results

General election

Polling

Polling

Results

District 3

The 3rd district is based in South Jersey and includes parts of Burlington and Ocean counties. The incumbent was Republican Tom MacArthur, who has represented the district since 2015. He was re-elected to a second term with 59% of the vote in 2016. Close votes required a re-count, with Andy Kim, the Democrat, in the lead.

Democratic primary
This is one of 80 Republican-held House districts targeted by the Democratic Congressional Campaign Committee in 2018.

Candidates
Declared
 Andy Kim, former United States National Security Council official and former diplomat

Withdrew
 Rich Dennison, attorney, funeral home director, and nominee for state senate (LD-7) in 2007 (died on January 22, 2018)
 Katherine Hartman, attorney

Declined
 John G. Ducey, Mayor of Brick
 Troy Singleton, state senator
 Pamela Rosen Lampitt, state assemblywoman
 Betsy Ryan, president and CEO of the New Jersey Hospital Association

Results

Republican primary

Results

General election

Polling

Endorsements

Results

District 4

The 4th district is based in Central Jersey and includes parts of Mercer, Monmouth and Ocean counties. The incumbent is Republican Chris Smith, who has represented the district since 1981. He was re-elected to a nineteenth term with 64% of the vote in 2016. Smith's 55% showing in 2018 was his lowest since 1982 when he earned 53%.

Democratic primary
Declared
 Jim Keady, former Asbury Park Councilman and candidate for NJ-3 in 2016
 Joshua Welle, navy veteran

Declined
 Kelly Stewart Maer, party operative

Withdrew
 Mike Keeling, music teacher

Endorsements

Results

Republican primary

Results

General election

Results

District 5

The 5th district is based in North Jersey and includes parts of Bergen, Passaic, Sussex and Warren counties. The incumbent is Democrat Josh Gottheimer, who has represented the district since 2017. He defeated Republican Representative Scott Garrett with 51% of the vote in 2016.

Democratic primary

Results

Republican primary

Candidates
Declared
 Steve Lonegan, former mayor of Bogota and nominee for Senate in 2013
 John McCann, attorney and former Cresskill Borough Councilman

Declined
 Michael J. Doherty, state senator
 Michael Ghassali, Mayor of Montvale
 Steve Oroho, state senator
 Jason Sarnoski, Warren County Freeholder
 Holly Schepisi, state assemblywoman
 Chuck Shotmeyer, businessman
 Parker Space, state assemblyman
 Harold J. Wirths, state assemblyman, former commissioner of the New Jersey Department of Labor and Workforce Development, and former Sussex County Freeholder
 Robert Auth, state assemblyman
 Lou Dobbs
 Scott Garrett, former U.S. Representative
 Sam Raia, former mayor of Saddle River and former chairman of the New Jersey Republican State Committee

Results

General election

Endorsements

Polling

Results

District 6

The 6th district is based in Central Jersey and includes parts of Middlesex and Monmouth counties. The incumbent is Democrat Frank Pallone, who has represented the district since 1988. He was re-elected to a fifteenth term with 64% of the vote in 2016.

Democratic primary

Results

Republican primary

Candidates
 Richard Pezzullo, businessman and candidate for Senate in 2014

Results

General election

Results

District 7

The 7th district includes all of Hunterdon County, and parts of Essex, Morris, Somerset, Union, and Warren Counties. The incumbent is Republican Leonard Lance, who has represented the district since 2009. He was re-elected to a fifth term with 54% of the vote in 2016.

Three Democrats were on the Democratic primary ballot. They included former Assistant Secretary of State for Democracy, Human Rights, and Labor Tom Malinowski; lawyer Goutam Jois; and social worker Peter Jacob. Green Party of New Jersey member Diane Moxley also announced her intent to run for the seat. Westfield teacher and attorney Lisa Mandelblatt withdrew in February 2017, as did Scotch Plains lawyer Scott Salmon. The Democratic County Parties in New Jersey's 7th District unanimously threw their support to Malinowski, and he received the county line for the June 5 primary in all counties.

Democratic primary
This is one of 80 Republican-held House districts targeted by the Democratic Congressional Campaign Committee in 2018.

Candidates
Declared
 Peter Jacob, social worker and nominee in 2016
 Goutam Jois, attorney
 Tom Malinowski, former Assistant Secretary of State for Democracy, Human Rights, and Labor

Withdrew
 Lisa Mandelblatt, teacher and attorney, withdrawn, February 2018, supporting Malinowski
 Scott Salmon, attorney, withdrawn February 2018, supporting Malinowski
 Linda Weber, bank executive
 David Pringle, environmental activist

Declined
 Bill Knox, wealth management specialist
 Christine Lui Chen, neuroscientist, healthcare executive and nominee for state senate (LD-23) in 2017
 Zenon Christodoulou, businessman and vice chair of the Somerset County Democratic Party
 Colleen Mahr, Mayor of Fanwood
 Keiona Miller, North Plainfield Borough Councilwoman
 Kurt Perhach, teacher and army prosecutor

Endorsements

Results
Malinowski won the Democratic nomination in the June primary.

Republican primary

Candidates
Declared
 Lindsay Brown, web developer
 Leonard Lance, incumbent Representative

Declined
 Rosemary Becchi, attorney
 Craig Heard, marketing consultant and candidate in 2016

Results

General election

Debates
Complete video of debate, October 17, 2018

Endorsements

Polling

Results

District 8

The 8th district is based in North Jersey and includes parts of Bergen, Essex, Hudson and Union counties. The incumbent is Democrat Albio Sires, who has represented the district since 2006. He was re-elected to a sixth term with 77% of the vote in 2016.

Democratic primary

Candidates
 Albio Sires, incumbent Representative

Results

Republican primary

Candidates
John Muniz

Results

General election

Results

District 9

The 9th district is based in North Jersey and includes parts of Bergen, Hudson and Passaic counties. The incumbent is Democrat Bill Pascrell, who has represented the district since 2013 after he was redistricted from the 8th district, which he had represented since 1997. He was re-elected to an eleventh term with 70% of the vote in 2016.

Democratic primary

Results

Republican primary

Candidates
Eric Fisher

Results

General election

Results

District 10

The 10th district is based in North Jersey and includes parts of Essex, Hudson and Union counties. The incumbent is Democrat Donald Payne Jr., who has represented the district since 2012. He was re-elected to a third term with 86% of the vote in 2016.

Democratic primary

Results

Republican primary

Candidates
Agha Khan

Results

General election

Results

District 11

The 11th district is based in North Jersey and includes parts of Essex, Morris, Passaic and Sussex counties. The incumbent is Republican Rodney Frelinghuysen, who has represented the district since 1995. He was re-elected to a twelfth term with 58% of the vote in 2016. Frelinghuysen announced in January 2018 that he will not seek re-election in 2018.

Democratic primary
This is one of 80 Republican-held House districts targeted by the Democratic Congressional Campaign Committee in 2018.

Candidates
Declared
 Mitchell Cobert, attorney
 Jack Gebbia, Army National Guard veteran
 Tamara Harris, divorce coach and college instructor
 Mikie Sherrill, retired navy helicopter pilot and former federal prosecutor
 Mark Washburne, County College of Morris professor

Withdrew
 John Bartlett, Passaic County Freeholder (running for re-election)

Declined
 Keith Kazmark, Mayor of Woodland Park
 John F. McKeon, state assemblyman
 Al Anthony, Livingston Township Councilman and former mayor of Livingston
 Mike Venezia, Mayor of Bloomfield

Results

Republican primary

Candidates
Declared
 Antony Ghee, JAG officer, investment banker, and attorney
 Martin Hewitt, attorney
 Jay Webber, state assemblyman and former chairman of the New Jersey Republican State Committee
 Peter De Neufville, former executive chairman of Voltaix, Inc.
 Patrick S Allocco, concert promoter and political campaign operative

Declined
 Rosemary Becchi, attorney and former U.S. Senate Finance Committee staff member
 Tom Mastrangelo, Morris County Freeholder
 Paul Miller, car dealer
 Christine Myers, Morris County Freeholder
 Nicolas Platt, Harding Township Committeeman
 Kate Whitman Annis, candidate for NJ-7 in 2008 and daughter of former governor Christine Todd Whitman
 Justin Bozonelis, investment banker
 Tony Bucco, state assemblyman (endorsed Jay Webber)
 Joe Caruso, businessman
 Kristin Corrado, state senator (endorsed Antony Ghee)
 BettyLou DeCroce, state assemblywoman (endorsed Antony Ghee)
 Rodney Frelinghuysen, incumbent representative
 Jim Gannon, Morris County Sheriff
 Jerry Langer, trucking company executive
 Nick Mangold, former Jets center
 Kevin J. O'Toole, chairman of the Port Authority of New York and New Jersey and former state senator
 Joseph Pennacchio, state senator
 Sylvia Petillo, Sussex County Freeholder Deputy Director (endorsed Antony Ghee)
 Steve Rogers, Nutley Commissioner of Public Affairs and candidate for governor in 2017

Endorsements

Results

General election

Debates
Complete video of debate, October 10, 2018

Polling

Endorsements

Results

District 12

The 12th district is based in Central Jersey and includes parts of Mercer, Middlesex, Somerset and Union counties. The district is known for its research centers and educational institutions such as Princeton University, Institute for Advanced Study, Johnson & Johnson and Bristol-Myers Squibb. The incumbent is Democrat Bonnie Watson Coleman, who has represented the district since 2015. She was re-elected to a second term with 63% of the vote in 2016.

Democratic primary

Results

Republican primary

Candidates
 Daryl Kipnis, attorney and nominee for state senate (LD-17) in 2017

Results

General election

Results

References

External links
Candidates at Vote Smart
Candidates at Ballotpedia
Campaign finance at FEC
Campaign finance at OpenSecrets

Official campaign websites of first district candidates
Donald Norcross (D) for Congress
Paul E. Dilks (R) for Congress

Official campaign websites of second district candidates
Seth Grossman (R) for Congress
Jeff Van Drew (D) for Congress

Official campaign websites of third district candidates
Tom MacArthur (R) for Congress
Andy Kim (D) for Congress

Official campaign websites of fourth district candidates
Christopher H. Smith (R) for Congress
Josh Welle (D) for Congress

Official campaign websites of fifth district candidates
Josh Gottheimer (D) for Congress
John McCann (R) for Congress

Official campaign websites of sixth district candidates
Frank Pallone Jr. (D) for Congress
Rich Pezzullo (R) for Congress

Official campaign websites of seventh district candidates
Leonard Lance (R) for Congress
Tom Malinowski (D) for Congress

Official campaign websites of eighth district candidates
Albio Sires (D) for Congress

Official campaign websites of ninth district candidates
Bill Pascrell (D) for Congress

Official campaign websites of tenth district candidates
Donald M. Payne Jr. (D) for Congress
Agha Khan (R) for Congress

Official campaign websites of eleventh district candidates
Mikie Sherrill (D) for Congress
Jay Webber (R) for Congress

Official campaign websites of twelfth district candidates
Bonnie Watson Coleman (D) for Congress
Daryl Kipnis (R) for Congress

2018
New Jersey
United States House of Representatives